Darling Downs Solar Farm is a 110MW photovoltaic solar power station in Queensland, Australia developed by APA Group 45 km west of Dalby in the Darling Downs region next to the Darling Downs Power Station. All of the power it produces will be sold to Origin Energy until 2030. It connects to the national electricity grid through Powerlink's Braemar substation.

It was planned by Origin Energy, which owns the adjacent natural gas Darling Downs Power Station.

Darling Downs was the ninth solar farm approved by the Western Downs Regional Council.

References

Solar power stations in Queensland

External links 
 Darling Downs Solar Project